Live at the Isle of Fehmarn is a posthumous live album by Jimi Hendrix, released on December 13, 2005, by Dagger Records. It was recorded by the post-Band of Gypsys Jimi Hendrix Experience that included Hendrix, Mitch Mitchell, and Billy Cox.  The album documents their performance at the Open Air Love & Peace Festival in Fehmarn, Germany on September 6, 1970, which was Hendrix's final official concert performance.

Several amateur recordings were made and released as bootlegs over the years, and after a new audio recording made by the festival’s promoter surfaced, the album was mixed and produced. Indeed, unknown to Hendrix, the promoters captured the group’s entire performance by feeding two overhead stage microphones into a consumer grade Revox reel-to-reel tape machine located off to the side of the stage.

Track listing
All songs were written by Jimi Hendrix, except where noted.

"Introduction" – 0:44
"Killing Floor" (Chester Arthur Burnett  Howlin' Wolf) – 4:18
"Spanish Castle Magic" – 5:42
"All Along the Watchtower" (Bob Dylan) – 4:57
"Hey Joe" (Billy Roberts) – 4:42
"Hey Baby (New Rising Sun)" – 6:22
"Message to Love" – 5:27
"Foxy Lady" – 4:27
"Red House" – 10:49
"Ezy Ryder" – 3:51
"Freedom" – 4:51
"Room Full of Mirrors" – 3:57
"Purple Haze" – 3:16
"Voodoo Child (Slight Return)" – 7:13

Personnel
Jimi Hendrixguitar, vocals
Mitch Mitchelldrums
Billy Coxbass guitar, backing vocals

References

Live albums published posthumously
Jimi Hendrix live albums
2005 live albums
Dagger Records live albums